The Independent Chief Inspector of Borders and Immigration, formerly the  Independent Chief Inspector of the UK Border Agency, is a government appointed official responsible for providing independent scrutiny of the UK's border and immigration functions such as the Border Force. The role of the Independent Chief Inspector was established by section 48 of the UK Borders Act 2007. In 2009, the Independent Chief Inspector's remit was extended to include customs functions and contractors.

On 26 April 2009, the Independent Chief Inspector was also appointed to the statutory role of independent Monitor for Entry Clearance Refusals without the Right of Appeal as set out in section 23 of the Immigration and Asylum Act 1999, as amended by section 4(2) of the Immigration, Asylum and Nationality Act 2006.

The Independent Chief Inspector works to ensure scrutiny of the UK's border and immigration functions, providing confidence and assurance as to their effectiveness and efficiency. The Chief Inspector is completely independent and reports directly to the Home Secretary. The Chief Inspector does not investigate individual cases. The resulting reports can be robust in their criticism of the UK Border Agency.

The current Independent Chief Inspector is David Neal, former Provost Marshal (Army) and Commander of 1 Military Police Brigade. Neal was appointed by the Home Secretary, Priti Patel, for a period of three years. He took up his post on 22 March 2021 and is preceded by David Bolt (in post from 1 May 2015 to 21 March 2021) and John Vine (in post from 7 July 2008 to 19 December 2014).

References

External links
 

United Kingdom border control
Home Office (United Kingdom)